Viriconium is an omnibus collection of the entire Viriconium sequence by M. John Harrison. It consists of the three novels, and all the short stories from the collection Viriconium Nights.  It was published in 2000 by Orion Books as volume 7 of their Fantasy Masterworks series.  Several of the stories first appeared in the magazines New Worlds and Interzone. The short stories appear here in a running order different from earlier publications of Viriconium Nights and it appears that the  whole Viriconium sequence is here arranged by some internal chronology.

Contents
 "Viriconium Knights"
 The Pastel City (novel)
 "The Lords of Misrule"
 "Strange Great Sins"
 A Storm of Wings (novel) 
 "The Dancer from the Dance"
 "The Luck in the Head"
 "The Lamia and Lord Cromis"
 In Viriconium (novel) 
 "A Young Man’s Journey to Viriconium"

References

Fantasy short story collections
2000 short story collections